Khasia ("from Antin Khasa") is a fossil genus of marsupial in the family Microbiotheriidae. It contains one known species, Khasia cordillerensis, which is known from teeth found in the Santa Lucia Formation of  Mizque, Bolivia, where it lived alongside the sparassodonts Allqokirus, Mayulestes and Pucadelphys.

References

Microbiotheriidae
Danian genera
Prehistoric marsupial genera